The 1912–13 Scottish Division Two was won by Ayr United, with Leith Athletic finishing bottom.

Table

References 

 Scottish Football Archive

Scottish Division Two seasons
2